Gaustad is a surname. Notable people with the surname include:

 Dutch Gaustad (1889–1945), American football player 
 Edwin Gaustad (1923–2011), American historian
 John Anders Gaustad (born 1980), Norwegian cross-country skier 
 Paul Gaustad (born 1982), American ice hockey player
 Randi Gaustad (born 1942), Norwegian curator and art historian

See also
 Gaustad, neighbourhood of Oslo
 Gustad, surname

Norwegian-language surnames